Justo Pastor Jacquet Muñoz (born 9 September 1961) is a retired association football defender from Paraguay, who played as a left back during his career. He played professional football for Cerro Porteño in Paraguay and also had spells in Argentina, Brazil and Peru.

International 
Jacquet made his international debut for the Paraguay national football team on 2 June 1983 in a friendly match against Uruguay (0-0). He obtained a total number of 40 international caps, scoring no goals for the national side. Jacquet represented his native country at four Copa América's: 1983, 1987, 1989 and 1991.

External links

1961 births
Living people
Paraguayan footballers
Paraguay international footballers
Paraguayan expatriate footballers
Association football defenders
Expatriate footballers in Argentina
Expatriate footballers in Brazil
Expatriate footballers in Peru
1983 Copa América players
1987 Copa América players
1989 Copa América players
1991 Copa América players
Talleres de Córdoba footballers
Sport Club Internacional players
Cerro Porteño players
Sportspeople from Asunción